Matthew "Matt" Ludwig (born July 5, 1996) is an American pole vaulter.

Biography 
Ludwig is a native of Ohio. He attended  the University of Missouri before transferring to the University of Akron where he graduated in 2019 with a degree in biomedical engineering.

Ludwig was originally an alternate on the three-man U.S. Olympic pole vault team at the 2020 Tokyo Olympics, but subsequently competed as an Olympian after bronze medalist and reigning world champion Sam Kendricks tested positive for COVID-19 and was declared out of the Tokyo Games.

Career highlights 

 2017 Outdoor NCAA Champion
 2020 U.S. Indoor Champion
 2021 Tokyo Olympic Alternate
Best indoors: 5.85m or (19ft 2.5 in) 
Best outdoors: 5.90m (19ft 4.25 in)

References

External links 
 
 
 
 
 
 

1996 births
Living people
American pole vaulters
People from Ohio
Athletes (track and field) at the 2020 Summer Olympics
Olympic track and field athletes of the United States